Isidora Andrea Jiménez Ibacache (born 10 August 1993 in Concepción) is a Chilean athlete specializing in the sprinting and Relay race events.

She won a public vote, and thus was named the flagbearer of Chile at the 2015 Pan American Games opening ceremony.

National records

References

External links
 

1993 births
Living people
Chilean female sprinters
World Athletics Championships athletes for Chile
Athletes (track and field) at the 2016 Summer Olympics
Olympic athletes of Chile
Athletes (track and field) at the 2018 South American Games
South American Games silver medalists for Chile
South American Games medalists in athletics
Athletes (track and field) at the 2019 Pan American Games
Pan American Games competitors for Chile
Olympic female sprinters
People from Concepción, Chile
21st-century Chilean women